The Tanger-Ville Railway Terminal (French: Gare Tanger Ville) is a train terminal administered by ONCF in Tangier, Morocco. The station is the terminus of the Al-Boraq line, which was inaugurated as the first high-speed rail line in Africa on 15 November, 2018.

References

Railway stations in Morocco
Buildings and structures in Tangier
Transport in Tangier